Tuulikki may refer to
Tuulikki (name), a Finnish female given name
Tuulikki (spirit), a forest goddess or spirit in Eastern Finnish mythology
2716 Tuulikki, a minor planet discovered by Y. Väisälä
Tuulikki Mons, a mountain on Venus
Tuulikki–Vampula, a minor airport in Vampula, Finland